The Hosgri Fault (also Hosgri Fault Zone, San Gregorio-Hosgri Fault Zone) is an offshore fault zone located near the Central Coast of California in San Luis Obispo County.

Characteristics 
The Hosgri Fault is a component of the San Andreas Fault system. Its movement is primarily reverse thrust, as well as exhibiting right lateral slip, and is thought to be capable of generating earthquakes of up to magnitude 7.5.  The November 4, 1927 Lompoc earthquake (magnitude 7.1) is thought to have occurred (uncertainty) on this fault.

Diablo Canyon Power Plant 

Seismologists monitor activity on the Hosgri fault constantly because of its physical proximity to the nuclear Diablo Canyon Power Plant. In fact, the fault lies only 2½ miles offshore from the nuclear power plant.  More recently in 2008, yet another even closer fault was discovered, the Shoreline Fault 1 mile from the NPP.

References 

Seismic faults of California
Geology of San Luis Obispo County, California
Cambria, California
Morro Bay